Tricyphona immaculata is a species of fly in the family Pediciidae. It is found in the  Palearctic.

References

External links
Images representing Tricyphona at BOLD

Limoniidae
Insects described in 1804
Nematoceran flies of Europe